Eadwold of Cerne, also known as Eadwold of East Anglia, was a 9th-century hermit, East Anglian prince and patron saint of Cerne, Dorset, who lived as a hermit on a hill about four miles from Cerne. His feast day is 29 August.

Life
St. Eadwold was born about 835 AD, the son of Æthelweard of East Anglia and reputed brother of  Edmund, king of East Anglia. He left his homeland possibly due to Viking Invasion, to live as a hermit on a hill about four miles from Cerne, Dorset. William of Malmesbury said he lived on bread and water, and worked many miracles. He is known from the writing of William of Malmesbury and the Hagiographies of St Eadwold of Cerne, by Goscelin of Saint-Bertin and also Secgan.

Veneration

Eadwold died, August 29, at Cerne and is said to have been buried in his cell, and was later translated to a nearby monastery, dedicated to St Peter. His veneration is credited with making Cerne Abbey the third richest in England during the 11th century.

References

External links
 

Medieval English saints
9th-century Christian saints
East Anglian saints
English Christian monks
English hermits
9th-century Christian monks
9th-century English people